Murayama-kami Dam is an earthfill dam located in Tokyo prefecture in Japan. The dam is used for water supply. The catchment area of the dam is 1.3 km2. The dam impounds about 41  ha of land when full and can store 3321 thousand cubic meters of water. The construction of the dam was completed in 1924.

References

Dams in Tokyo Prefecture
1924 establishments in Japan